Rot-Front is a settlement 60 kilometres east of Bishkek in the Chüy Region of Kyrgyzstan, near the border of Kazakhstan. Its population was 968 in 2021. Originally settled by Germans, a significant minority remains. It was founded as Bergtal (also sometimes spelt Bergthal) and renamed Rot-Front in 1927.

History

At the end of the 19th century, German-speaking settlers from the Russian Empire moved to Central Asia to obtain new lands. Most these settlers were Mennonites. The village of Bergtal, one of several originally German settlements in Kyrgyzstan, was established on the very rich black soil of the Chüy Valley, at the foot of the Tian Shan mountains, by Baptist and Mennonite families who had emigrated from East Frisia some three hundred years earlier to escape forced military service. At the end of the 19th century many moved to central Asia from the Volga and Crimea.

With the Stalinization of the Soviet Union, in 1927 the village of Bergtal was renamed Rotfront and all religious practices were forbidden. During the time of the Third Reich, the ethnic Germans of Rotfront were subject to much suspicion and discrimination. They tried to explain that they did not identify with the Germans of Nazi Germany, referring to their distant Polish ancestry or relatives.

With the onset of Perestroika under Mikhail Gorbachev, the residents of Bergtal could again freely practice their religious faith. After the end of the Soviet Union, many ethnic Germans emigrated from Kyrgyzstan to Germany, as with the collapse of the collective farms and other state enterprises many jobs were lost. In 1990, there were about nine hundred people of German background living in the village; by 2012, the population was down to about 500.

Today
After Kyrgyzstan's independence in 1991, arising from the collapse of the Soviet Union, the remaining German residents received permission to display the village's original name, Bergtal, on their road signs, underneath the official designation of "Rotfront".  A small museum in the school house, established with financial support from the German government, displays letters and photographs recounting the migration of the villagers' ancestors to Kyrgyzstan and their past life in the village. Since the beginning of the 1990s, the German government has also provided a German teacher for the community.  Generous financial and material aid from the German government for the local agricultural cooperative has, however, for the most part been wasted or misused.

In 1995 a film was made entitled Milch und Honig aus Rotfront (Milk and Honey from Rotfront), depicting the life of the German residents of Bergtal.

Today, Bergtal/Rotfront has the second largest community of people of German background in central Asia, although a majority of the population of the village is now of Kyrgyz descent. It is believed to be the only remaining village in central Asia with a substantial German minority.

As strict Mennonites, the residents continue to reject the use of alcohol, television, films and dancing.

References

External links
Mennonites in  Photo documentary about inhabitants of Bergtal/Rotfront, by photographer Wim Klerkx, 1996/97.

German diaspora in Asia
Populated places in Chüy Region
Mennonitism